The 2011 Virginia Cavaliers men's soccer team represented the University of Virginia during the 2011 NCAA Division I men's soccer season.

Ahead of the season, the team was trying to advance further into the NCAA Division I Men's Soccer Championship, after being eliminated in the first round the previous year. Although the Cavaliers suffered some initial struggles early in the campaign, the team pulled together a chain of conference wins, and reached the semifinals of the 2011 ACC Men's Soccer Tournament, before falling to North Carolina in the semifinals. Still, the Cavaliers earned an at-large berth into the 2011 NCAA Division I Men's Soccer Tournament, where they hosted CAA Champions, Delaware. The Blue Hens defeated the Cavaliers, 1–0 in extra time, making it the first time since 1987 that the Cavaliers were consecutively eliminated in first round of the NCAA Tournament.

Background 
The Cavaliers entered the 2010 season as the defending NCAA National Champions, winning their first national title since the Bruce Arena years of the early to mid-1990s. During the 2010 campaign, the Cavaliers earned an at-large berth into the 2010 NCAA Division I Men's Soccer Championship, where they were eliminated by in-state rival, Old Dominion, whom play in the Colonial Athletic Association. It was the first time since 1996 that the Cavaliers were eliminated in the first round of the NCAA Tournament.

Competitions 

Home team is listed on the right, and the away team is listed on the left.

Preseason

Regular season

ACC Standings

Results summary

Results by round

Game reports

ACC Tournament

NCAA Tournament

References

Virginia Cavaliers, Men
2011 ACC men's soccer season
2011
Cavaliers